Rifat Hoxha (born 15 July 1946) is an Albanian author and historian. He was born in the village of Domën, just outside Kavajë, in the present-day municipality of Rrogozhinë. After completing high school studies in his hometown, Rifat enrolled at Tirana's Faculty of Philology where he graduated with a degree in languages and literature. He has participated actively in the literary life of Kavajë by publishing numerous books of historical character.

Works
Historical publications
 Kavaja në Shekuj I (1595–1944)
 Kavaja në Shekuj II (1945–1990)
 Instituti Shqiptaro-Amerikan i Kavajës (1925–1939)
 Kavaja në Luftën për Pavarësi 
 Kavaja Arkeologjike
 Legjenda të Vendlindjes
 Kavaja në vitet 1945–1990
 Kavaja kur nuk ishte dhe si u bë 
 Kavaja në Lidhjen Shqiptare të Prizrenit (1878–1881)
 Histori e Islamit në Kavajë

Novels
 Kalorësit e këngës
 E fshehta e Kullës së Sahatit
 I vdekuri që varri nuk e mban...
 Rruga e Madhe
 Jeta e fshehtë pas martese...
 Aktorja që nuk u thinj
 Princesha e Irminit
 Fytyra e heshtjes
 E fshehta e Kullës së Sahatit II

Monographs
 Korbi dhe Migjeni
 Peshkopi i Arbërisë
 Kadareja, Nobeli dhe letërsia e braktisur
 Haxhi Xhaferr Shkodra
 Shyqyri Mahmudaj

Essays
 Legjenda të vendlindjes
 Kënga popullore e Kavajës

References

1946 births
Albanian writers
Living people
Writers from Kavajë